Acanthodica cabra is a moth of the family Noctuidae first described by Paul Dognin in 1894. It is found in Ecuador.

References

Catocalina
Moths of South America
Moths described in 1894